Mantharta is a partly extinct dialect cluster spoken in the southern Pilbara region of Western Australia. There were four varieties, which were distinct but largely mutually intelligible. The four were:

 Tharrgari (Tharrkari, Dhargari), still spoken c. 2005
 Warriyangka (Wadiwangga), still spoken c. 1973
 Thiin (Thiinma), still spoken c. 2021
 Jiwarli (Tjiwarli), extinct by 2004

The name mantharta comes from the word for "man" in all four varieties.

Language revival
, the Warriyangga dialect is one of 20 languages prioritised as part of the Priority Languages Support Project, being undertaken by First Languages Australia and funded by the Department of Communications and the Arts. The project aims to "identify and document critically-endangered languages — those languages for which little or no documentation exists, where no recordings have previously been made, but where there are living speakers".

References

 
Extinct languages of Western Australia